Melish is a surname. Notable people with the surname include:

John Melish (1771–1822), Scottish mapmaker 
Thomas G. Melish (1876–1948), American entrepreneur and coin collector
William Bromwell Melish (1852–1927), American businessman and Freemason leader
William Howard Melish (1910–1986), American Episcopalian and social leader